Franklin Street may refer to:

Australia
Franklin Street, Adelaide

Canada
Franklin Street (Victoria, BC), named after Lumley Franklin

 United States
Franklin Street (Baltimore), Maryland
Franklin Street (Boston), Massachusetts
Franklin Street (Chapel Hill), North Carolina
Franklin Street (Chicago), Illinois, intersects with Wacker Drive

Franklin Street (Manhattan), New York, home of the New York Academy of Art
Franklin Street (Portland, Maine)
Franklin Street (Richmond), Virginia

Other uses:
Franklin Street station (Pennsylvania) in Reading, Pennsylvania, USA
Franklin Street station (IRT Broadway–Seventh Avenue Line), a New York City Subway station
Franklin Street station (IRT Ninth Avenue Line), a former New York City elevated station
Franklin Street station (IRT Sixth Avenue Line), a former New York City elevated station
Franklin Street station (Wisconsin), a former Milwaukee Road station in Madison, Wisconsin
Franklin Street Terminal, a former Chicago "L" station
Franklin Street Bridge, in Chicago
Franklin Street Park, in Cambridge, Massachusetts
Franklin Street Presbyterian Church and Parsonage, in Baltimore

See also
Franklin Avenue (disambiguation)